There are several streets named after Olof Palme, the former Swedish prime minister, assassinated in 1986.

The first street was renamed on April 23, 1986 in Stockholm. It was a major portion of the street Tunnelgatan, that crossed Sveavägen, that was renamed. It was in that very crossing that Palme was shot on 28 February 1986.

  Olof Palme Street, a street in Algiers, Algeria. . 
  Olof Palme Garden, a park in Algiers, Algeria. .
  Calle Olof Palme, a short street in Buenos Aires, Argentina.
  Olof-Palme-Platz, a square in Traiskirchen, Austria.
  Olof-Palme-Platz, a square in Wiener Neustadt, Austria.
  Avenida Olof Palme, a street in Rio de Janeiro, Brazil.
  Olof Palmes Allé, a street in Aarhus, Denmark.
  Olof Palmes Gade, a street in Copenhagen, Denmark.
  Calle Olof Palme, a street in Santo Domingo, Dominican Republic.
  Boulevard Olof Palme, a boulevard in Émerainville, France.
  Boulevard Olof Palme, a boulevard in Hénin-Beaumont, France.
  Boulevard Olof Palme, a boulevard in Pau, France.
  Rue Olof Palme, a street in Créteil, France.
  Rue Olof Palme, a street in Clichy, France.
  Rue Olof Palme, a street in Montpellier, France.
  Rue Olof Palme, a street in Rezé, France.
  Olof-Palme-Platz, a square in Berlin, Germany.
  Olof-Palme-Platz, a square in Nuremberg, Germany.
  Olof-Palme-Platz, a square in Stralsund, Germany.
  Olof-Palme-Damm, a street (B76) in Kiel, Germany.
  Olof-Palme-Straße, a street in Augsburg, Germany.
  Olof-Palme-Straße, a street in Frankfurt am Main, Germany.
  Olof-Palme-Straße, a street in Leverkusen, Germany.
  Olof-Palme-Straße, a street in Munich, Germany.
  Οδός Ούλοφ Πάλμε, a street in Athens, Greece.
  Οδός Ούλοφ Πάλμε, a street in Thessaloniki, Greece.
  Οδός Ούλοφ Πάλμε, a street in Heraklion, Greece.
  Olof Palme Sétány, a street in Budapest, Hungary.
  Olof Palme Marg, a street in New Delhi, India.
  Olof Palme, a park in Sulemania, Iraq.
  Via Olof Palme, a street in Chiaravalle, Italy.
  Via Sven Olof Palme, a circular road that encircles the town of Bitonto, Italy.
  Via Olof Palme, a street in Ferrara, Italy.
  Via Olof Palme, a street in Nuoro, Italy.
  Via Olof Palme, a street in Cesena, Italy.
  Avenida Olof Palme, a street in Maputo, Mozambique.
  Olof Palmestraat, a street in Windhoek, Namibia.
  Olof Palmeplein, a square in Amsterdam, Netherlands
 Olof Palmelaan, a street in Beverwijk, Netherlands.
  Olof Palmelaan, a street in Zoetermeer, Netherlands.
  Olof Palmestraat, a street in Delft, Netherlands.
  S.O.J. Palmelaan, a street in Groningen, Netherlands.
  Ulitsa Ulofa Pal'me (улица Улофа Пальме), a street in Moscow, Russia.
  Ulica Ulofa Palmea, a street in Belgrade, Serbia.
  Palmejeva ulica, a street in Ljubljana, Slovenia.
  Olof Palme Street, a street in Port Elizabeth, South Africa.
  Calle Olof Palme, a street in Alicante, Spain.
  Calle Olof Palme, a street in Badajoz, Spain.
  Calle Olof Palme, a street in Las Palmas, Spain.
  Calle Olof Palme, a street in Murcia, Spain.
  Calle Olof Palme, a street in Sabadell, Spain.
  Calle Olof Palme, a street in Valencia, Spain.
  Olof Palme, a park in Madrid, Spain.
  Plaça Olof Palme, a street in Terrassa, Spain.
  Olof Palmes gata, a street in Stockholm, Kalmar, Piteå, Trollhättan and Umeå in Sweden.
  Olof Palmes torg, a square in Örebro, Sweden.
  Olof Palmes torg, a square in Västerås, Sweden.
  Olof Palmes torg, a square in Sundsvall, Sweden.
  Olof Palmes plats, a square in Gothenburg, Sweden.
  Olof Palmes plats, a square in Malmö, Sweden.
  Olof Palmes plats, a square in Södertälje, Sweden.
  Olof Palmes plats, a square in Uppsala, Sweden.
  Olof Palmes väg, a street in Kungälv, Sweden.
  Olof Palmes väg, a street in Nyköping, Sweden.
  Olof Palme Caddesi, the main street of Kulu, Turkey.
  Olof Palme Human Rights Park, a park in  İzmir, Turkey.
  Olof Palme Grove, a cul-de-sac in Stoke-on-Trent, United Kingdom.
  Улица Улоф Палме, a street in Skopje, North Macedonia. .

See also
 List of Olof Palme memorials

Palme, Olof
Olof Palme